Städtisches Waldstadion, known as OSTALB ARENA for sponsorship purposes, is a multi-purpose stadium in Aalen, Germany.  It is currently used mostly for football matches and is the home stadium of VfR Aalen. The stadium is able to hold 14,500 people.

Capacity

References

Football venues in Germany
Multi-purpose stadiums in Germany
VfR Aalen
Buildings and structures in Ostalbkreis
Sports venues in Baden-Württemberg